Tommy Lewis was a Welsh professional footballer who played for New Brighton.

In 1929 Lewis was selected for the Football Association of Wales tour of Canada but these matches were not classed as international cap matches. Lewis and Bob Pugh of Newport County were the only two players in the squad not to attain full international caps either before or after the tour.

References

Welsh footballers
New Brighton A.F.C. players
English Football League players
Association footballers not categorized by position